InHour is a unit of reactivity of a nuclear reactor.  It stands for the inverse of an hour.  It is equal to the inverse of the period in hours.  One InHour is the amount of reactivity needed to increase the reaction from critical to where the power will increase by a factor of e in one hour.

The unit is abbreviated  ih or inhr, and is usually measured with a reactimeter.

See also
Per cent mille

References 

Units of measurement